Château-Gontier-sur-Mayenne is a commune in the Mayenne department in north-western France. It was established on 1 January 2019 by merger of the former communes of Château-Gontier (the seat), Azé and Saint-Fort.

Population

See also
Communes of the Mayenne department

References

Communes of Mayenne
Subprefectures in France